Nikos Tsiantakis (born 20 October 1963) is a Greek former football midfielder.

Career
He most prominently played for Panionios NFC and Olympiacos. His appearance at the 1994 World Cup rounded off his national team career, which lasted from 1988 to 1994, giving him 47 caps and 2 international goals. Shortly after the World Cup he went from Olympiacos to Aris Thessaloniki F.C., playing for various Greek teams before retiring in 1999. Currently owning a PROPO (Greek betting) shop, in Pefki (Athens suburb). While playing, he demonstrated great pace and dribbling skills and possessed a decent cross-pass skill.

Career statistics

References

External links

1963 births
Living people
Greek footballers
Aris Thessaloniki F.C. players
1994 FIFA World Cup players
Association football midfielders
Olympiacos F.C. players
Greece international footballers
Panionios F.C. players
OFI Crete F.C. players
Ionikos F.C. players
Ethnikos Asteras F.C. players
Super League Greece players
People from Trikala (regional unit)
Footballers from Thessaly